Dieter Grabe (born 13 September 1945) is an East German former cyclist. He competed in the team time trial at the 1968 Summer Olympics.

References

External links
 

1945 births
Living people
People from Leipzig (district)
East German male cyclists
Cyclists from Saxony
Olympic cyclists of East Germany
Cyclists at the 1968 Summer Olympics
People from Bezirk Leipzig